Brigitte Rajchl is an Austrian para-alpine skier. She won medals representing Austria at the 1976 Winter Paralympics and at the 1980 Winter Paralympics. She also represented Austria at the 1984 Winter Paralympics and 1988 Winter Paralympics but did not win a medal at these games.

Achievements

See also 
 List of Paralympic medalists in alpine skiing

References 

Living people
Year of birth missing (living people)
Paralympic alpine skiers of Austria
Alpine skiers at the 1976 Winter Paralympics
Alpine skiers at the 1980 Winter Paralympics
Alpine skiers at the 1984 Winter Paralympics
Alpine skiers at the 1988 Winter Paralympics
Paralympic bronze medalists for Austria
Paralympic silver medalists for Austria
Paralympic medalists in alpine skiing
Place of birth missing (living people)
Medalists at the 1976 Winter Paralympics
Medalists at the 1980 Winter Paralympics
Austrian female alpine skiers
Austrian amputees
20th-century Austrian women
21st-century Austrian women